Spearhead: An American Tank Gunner, His Enemy, and a Collision of Lives in World War II is a book about Clarence Smoyer, written by military history author Adam Makos, and published by Ballantine Books in 2019. 

The book reached number 3 on The New York Times Best Seller list on February 27, 2019.

Characters 

 Clarence Smoyer, American tank gunner
 Buck Marsh, American tank driver and Smoyer's best friend
 Gustav Schaefer, German Panther tank radioman

Plot summary  
The book honors an unsung hero, Clarence Smoyer, who despite his hatred for violence, becomes the gunner of one of the first Pershing tanks in the European Theatre. Smoyer and his tank crew lead the American invasion of Nazi Germany. Smoyer, whose tank crew is instrumental to the Battle of Cologne, recounts his step-by-step moves in the battle, particularly, shooting a car which unbeknown to him is carrying civilians. At the same time, the car is being shot by a German tank whose gunner is named Gustav Schaefer. Schaefer and Smoyer shoot each other for a few seconds. It ends when Smoyer's crew shoot down a nearby building which disables Shaefer's tank, but leave the Germans inside the tank unharmed. Schaefer and one of his friends escape while the rest of the crew decides to stand and fight. Schaefer credits Smoyer for saving him and his friend.

The biography comes to an end with the meeting of Smoyer and Schaefer in Cologne, sharing their war stories and getting up to date since the war.

Critical reception 
The book has received generally positive reviews. , it had a 4.61/5 community rating on Goodreads.

It was listed on The New York Times Best Seller list on 26 February 2019.

Later events
On September 18, 2019, Makos presided over a ceremony at the National World War II Memorial in which Smoyer and the other members of the Pershing tank crew were awarded Bronze Star medals with "V" device for valor.  Smoyer attended the ceremony in person while the families of the other crewmembers, who have passed away, received the medals on their behalf.

References

External links 
 Spearhead at Google Books
 Spearhead on Goodreads

2019 books
American biographies
Ballantine Books books
Books about World War II
Military books